Scott Hugh Walter (born 2 May 1989 in Brisbane, Queensland) is an Australian professional cricketer, who played as a left-arm fast-medium bowler for the Queensland Bulls.

Walter represented Queensland at youth level and played for the Queensland Academy of Sport. In the 2008–09 season, he represented Queensland's senior team for the first time, with performances that included a six-wicket haul in a Sheffield Shield match against Western Australia and another four wickets in a limited overs match against South Australia. His first class debut earlier in the season had been marred by an injury that meant he could only bowl eight overs in the match.

References

1989 births
Australian cricketers
Living people
Queensland cricketers